Alberto Vojtěch Frič (8 September 1882 Prague – 4 December 1944 Prague) was a famous Czech botanist, ethnographer, writer and explorer. He undertook 8 voyages to America, discovered, described and catalogued many species of cactus. South American Indians called him Karaí Pukú (engl. Long Hunter); in Europe he became known as Cactus Hunter.

Credited

 Lophophora fricii
 Stenocereus fricii
 Cleistocactus strausii var. fricii
 Notocactus fricii synonymum Malacocarpus fricii, Wigginsia fricii
 Airampoa
 Chaffeyopuntia
 Pseudotephrocactus
 Salmiopuntia
 Subulatopuntia
 Weberiopuntia

References

See also
Kukurá language

Czech botanists
Czech male writers
Czech explorers
Explorers of South America
Scientists from Prague
Writers from Prague

1882 births
1944 deaths
Deaths from tetanus